Lee Tabor Sholem (May 25, 1913 in Paris, Illinois, – August 19, 2000 in Los Angeles, California) was an American television and film director.

Nicknamed ""Roll 'Em" Sholem", he is identified more than anyone else in the industry with speed and efficiency. He directed more than 1300 productions, including both feature films and TV episodes, without ever going over schedule. His achievements over a 40-year career have, as yet, been unsurpassed in Hollywood history.

Sholem's first film was Tarzan's Magic Fountain in 1949 and his last film was Doomsday Machine in 1972.

Filmography
Catalina Caper
Doomsday Machine
Emergency Hospital 
Ma and Pa Kettle at Waikiki
Pharaoh's Curse
The Redhead from Wyoming
Sierra Stranger
The Stand at Apache River
Superman and the Mole Men 
Tarzan and the Slave Girl
Tarzan's Magic Fountain
Tobor the Great

Television credits
Men into Space
77 Sunset Strip
Maverick
Sugarfoot
Cheyenne
Captain Midnight
The Adventures of Long John Silver
Adventures of Superman
WhirlyBirds

External links

1913 births
2000 deaths
American television directors
People from Paris, Illinois
Film directors from Illinois